12" Mixes may refer to:

Twelve Inch Mixes (disambiguation)
12" Mixes (Bananarama album) Aussie only EP featuring remixes of 5 singles
12" Mixes Michael Jackson Aussie only EP featuring remixes of 5 singles